Alexander Johnson (August 1, 1830 – February 11, 1912) was an Irish mathematician and academic.

Born in Ireland, Johnson was educated at Trinity College, Dublin (TCD) where he was a Scholar in 1852 and received his B.A. in mathematics (with Gold Medal) in 1855. TCD later awarded him M.A. (1858) and LL.D. (1861). In 1857, he had emigrated to Canada and was appointed a Professor of Mathematics and Natural Philosophy at McGill University. He was Dean of the Faculty of Arts and a Vice-Principal from 1886 to 1903.

He received an honorary DCL from the University of Bishop's College, Lennoxville in 1882. He was an original member of the Royal Society of Canada and was made a Fellow. He was President of Section III (Mathematics and Physics and Chemistry) and of the whole Society from 1905 to 1906.

References

1830 births
Irish mathematicians
1912 deaths
Alumni of Trinity College Dublin
Scholars of Trinity College Dublin
Canadian university and college faculty deans
Canadian university and college vice-presidents
Fellows of the Royal Society of Canada
Irish emigrants to pre-Confederation Quebec
Academic staff of McGill University
Immigrants to the Province of Canada
Anglophone Quebec people